Vukicevic may refer to:

 Vukićević
 Vukičević